Kosmos-1378 was one of more than 2,400 Soviet artificial satellites launched as part of the USSR space program. Kosmos-1378 was launched from the Plesetsk Cosmodrome in the USSR, on June 10, 1982. The R-36 or RT-2 launch vehicle placed the satellite in orbit around Earth with an additional degree. The mass of the satellites at launch was approximately 2,200 kilograms. Kosmos-1378 was a satellite designed for electronic reconnaissance, communications and navigation (ELINT).

References

Soviet spacecraft